Orkney Football Club is a senior association football club from the Orkney Islands, Scotland. The club was founded in 2012 and competes in the North Caledonian Football League.

History 
In 2012, the Orkney Amateur Football Association (OAFA) embarked on a strategy of seeking further games against teams from the Highlands & Islands. That year, the Orkney Football Club were formed for entry in the North Caledonian Football Association's cup competitions. The club's formation had been driven by a desire for several decades for Orkney football players to be given more opportunities to compete at a higher level with the aim of improving the standard of Orkney's most popular sport.

Orkney gained full membership of the North Caledonian FA ahead of the 2014–15 season, becoming the first non-mainland club to play in the North Caledonian League itself. An impressive first season saw them finishing runners-up, while also securing the Ness Cup.

Honours
Orkney have won the following honours as members of the North Caledonian FA:

North Caledonian League (1): 
 2017–18
Football Times Cup (1): 
 2017–18
Jock Mackay Cup (2): 
 2016–17, 2019–20
Ness Cup (2): 
 2014–15, 2015–16

Ground 
Orkney have played at various grounds on the Island, including The Pickaquoy Centre, Kirkwall Grammar School and Dounby.

Since 2020, they have settled on a fixed home of The Rockworks in Holm.

References

External links
Official website

Football clubs in Scotland
North Caledonian Football League teams
Association football clubs established in 2012
2012 establishments in Scotland
Football in Orkney